Karl Johann August (Friedrich Wilhelm) Müller (16 December 1818 – 9 February 1899) was a German bryologist and science popularizer.

Prior to 1843 he worked as a pharmacist at several locations in Germany (Kranichfeld, Jever, Detmold and Blankenburg am Harz), followed by studies in botany at the University of Halle (1843 to 1846). In 1843 he became an assistant editor of Botanische Zeitung.  Together with Otto Ule and Emil Adolf Rossmässler, Müller founded the Die Natur which remained for decades the flagship journal of popular science in Germany. He authored several books to reach lay audiences in his attempt to spread an aesthetically imbued image of nature.

During his career he amassed a moss herbarium consisting of 12,000 bryological species. Pyrrhobryum parramattense is one of the many species he described. In 1898, Müller was a elected a member of the Leopoldina science academy.

Written works 
 Synopsis muscorum frondosorum (two volumes, 1849/1851). 
 Genera muscorum frondosorum (1901)., (with Karl Schliephacke).  
 Antäus oder to dir Natur im Spiegel der Menschheit.

References 
 Parts of this article are based on a translation of an equivalent article at the French Wikipedia.
 Darwin Correspondence Project- Müller, J.K.A.

External links 

Bryologists
1818 births
1899 deaths
University of Halle alumni
People from Allstedt
19th-century German botanists
19th-century German scientists